The Epidii (Greek: Επίδιοι) were a people of ancient Britain, known from a mention of them by the geographer Ptolemy c. 150. Epidion has been identified as the island of Islay in modern Argyll. Ptolemy does not list a town for the Epidii, but the Ravenna Cosmography (RC 108.4) mentions Rauatonium, which is assumed to be Southend.

Etymology 
The name Epidii includes the P-Celtic root epos, meaning "horse" (c.f. Welsh ebol, "a foal"). The Q-Celtic equivalent would be *ekwos, which became Old Gaelic ech. It is suggested that they were named after a horse god, whose name could be reconstructed as *Epidios.  The Q-Celtic equivalent would be *Ekwidios, which may be the origin of the Old Gaelic name Eochaid. The root *ep-anto-s, 'those who belong to the horse' or 'those who own horses', has also been proposed.

The Dagda, a Gaelic god, is often referred to as Eochaid Ollathair.

Language 
Although their name is almost certainly is Brittonic/P-Celtic, Dr Ewan Campbell suggest they were Goidelic/Q-Celtic speakers. He says "Ptolemy's source for his Scottish names was probably from the Scottish Central Lowlands, and may have transmitted the Brittonic form of a Goidelic tribal name, or even the external name given to the tribe by Brittonic speakers". Their territory later became the heartland of the Goidelic kingdom of Dál Riata. Alex Woolf suggests that the Epidii became the Dál Riata, but argues that they were Brittonic-speaking in Ptolemy's time. He also suggests that the Hebrides, called the Ebudae by Ptolemy, were named after the Epidii.


See also
Britons (historic)
Picts
Scottish people
Dál Riata

References

Sources

 Armit, Ian, Celtic Scotland, (2nd ed.) London: B.T. Batsford/Historic Scotland, 2005. 
 
 
Fitzpatrick-Matthews, Keith (5 August 2013) "Britannia in the Ravenna Cosmography: a reassessment." (pdf) Academia.edu. Retrieved 23 January 2015.
 Foster, Sally M., Picts, Gaels, and Scots (2nd ed.) London: B.T. Batsford/Historic Scotland, 2005. 

 The British Section of the Ravenna Cosmography in Archaeologia 93 (1949), 108.4
 Watson, W. J. (2004) The Celtic Place-Names of Scotland. Edinburgh. Birlinn. . First published 1926.

External links
 The circumnavigation of Scotland compares Ptolemy and the Ravenna Cosmography for the south west coast of Scotland

Celtic Britons
Historical Celtic peoples
Tribes mentioned by Ptolemy